John Skerrett (Augustinian), Irish preacher and missionary, c.1620–c.1688.

John Skerrett was a member of one of the Tribes of Galway, a descendant of Richard Huskard. He studied for the clergy in Andalusia, and afterwards he was ordained as a member of the Augustinian order. He gained an excellent reputation as a preacher at Cádiz, where he also taught moral theology.

After about twenty years in Spain he was stationed at Orotava and Puerto de la Cruz on Tenerife for four years, following which he returned to Galway, sometime in the 1660s. While there he taught Latin and was prior of the order's town convent.

Skerrett is notable for been the first Augustinian missionary in the Americas, working mainly in Virginia and the West Indies during the 1670s, as well as Cuba and Puerto Rico in the 1680s.

The last documented reference to him is as the Commissary-General of the Augustinians in England in 1688.

See also

 John Skerrett (Mayor) of Galway 1491–1492.
 James Skerrett, fl. 1513–1532, Mayor of Galway.
 Nicholas Skerrett, died 1583, Archbishop of Tuam
 Michael Skerrett, died 1785, Archbishop of Tuam

References
 Obstinate' Skerrett, Missionary in Virginia, the West Indies and England, (c.1674–c.1688)"  F.X. Martin, Journal of the Galway Archaeological and Historical Society, Volume 35, 1975

17th-century Irish Roman Catholic priests
People from County Galway
Irish Roman Catholic missionaries
Augustinian friars
Roman Catholic missionaries in the United States
Roman Catholic missionaries in Puerto Rico
Roman Catholic missionaries in Cuba
Irish expatriates in the Spanish Empire
Irish expatriates in Spain